Algeria women's national basketball team is the nationally controlled basketball team representing Algeria at world basketball competitions for women.

Results

African Championship
 1968 : 4th
 1974 : 9th
 1977 : 8th
 1981 : 8th
 1990 : 8th
 2003 : 10th
 2013 : 11th
 2015 : 11th

African Games
 2007 : 6th

Mediterranean Games
 2022 : 10th

External links
 FIBA profile

national
Women's national basketball teams
Basketball